1 of the Girls  was a Cleveland-based R&B group discovered by Gerald Levert. The group's self-titled album was released in 1993, and featured the single "Do Da What", which only achieved moderate success. Another single, "Handle With Care" as also released from that album.

1 of the Girls group member Nina Creque appeared on 8Ball & MJG's Gold release single "Space Age Pimpin" and "Love Hurts" and she also appeared on "Running out of Bud" with Dave Tolliver of Men at Large. Ra-Deon Kirkland appeared on Walter Beasley's single "Don't Say Goodnight" on his album For Her. She is also a featured soloist with Pastor Ron Williams and Voices of Koinonia, appearing on multiple albums, some as Ra-Deon Sledge. Singles include "They that Trust" on Straight out of Zion and "I Love the Name" on Straight out of Zion, Vol. II: Churchin' At the Tabernacle. Marvelous Miles currently works in television production, working behind the scenes on series produced by VH1 and Bravo! networks.

Nina Creque, died in February 2019 from an "undisclosed illness" .

Members 

 Nina Creque (the daughter of jazz musician Neal Creque)
 LaShawn Sykes
 Marvelous Miles
 Ra-Deon Kirkland

Albums

 Name: 1 of the Girls

 Tracks:
Ain't Giving Up Nothing	4:30
Do Da What	5:11
Talkin' Loud	4:02
No Can Do	3:47
Handle With Care	5:11
Sorry Didn't Do It	6:41
Gotta Go	4:43
When We Kiss	4:54
Giving The Best Of My Love	5:48
Will You Be Mine	5:19
I Don't Want Your Man	4:12

 Extra credits:

Singles

References

American contemporary R&B musical groups
American girl groups